Balestrino ( or ) is a comune (municipality) in the Province of Savona in the Italian region Liguria, located about  southwest of Genoa and about  southwest of Savona.

History
Balestrino is composed by the old historic town, upon a hill, and the new town below it. Abandoned in 1953 for hydrogeological instability, the old centre is a ghost town whereas the modern center is still inhabited today.

Geography
Balestrino borders the following municipalities: Castelvecchio di Rocca Barbena, Ceriale, Cisano sul Neva, Toirano, and Zuccarello. It counts the hamlets (frazioni) of  Bergalla, Borgo, Cuneo, and Poggio.

Demographics

Gallery

Other 
There are small medieval and renaissance crossbows known as balestrino crossbows (aka assassins crossbows).

References

External links

 Balestrino official website
 Balestrino tourist website

Cities and towns in Liguria
Ghost towns in Italy